This is a list of Billboard magazine's top popular songs of 1946 according to retail sales.

See also
1946 in music
List of number-one singles of 1946 (U.S.)
Billboard Most-Played Folk Records of 1946
Billboard Most-Played Race Records of 1946

References

1946 record charts
Billboard charts